Karmala Assembly constituency (244) is one of the 288 Vidhan Sabha (legislative assembly) constituencies of Maharashtra state in western India.

Overview
Karmala (constituency number 244) is one of the eleven Vidhan Sabha constituencies located in the Solapur district. It covers the entire Karmala tehsil and part of the Madha tehsil of this district. The number of electors in 2009 was 250,527 (male 132,006, female 118,521).

Karmala is part of the Madha Lok Sabha constituency along with five other Vidhan Sabha segments, namely Madha, Sangola and Malshiras in the Solapur district and Phaltan and Man in the Satara district.

Members of Legislative Assembly

Karmala Vidhansabha Constituency (1951-Present)

Madha Assembly constituency, 1957

Assembly elections 2019

See also
 Karmala
 List of constituencies of Maharashtra Vidhan Sabha

References

Assembly constituencies of Solapur district
Assembly constituencies of Maharashtra